Albert Christopher Schulz (May 12, 1889 – December 13, 1931), was a professional baseball player who played pitcher in the Major Leagues from -. He would play for the New York Yankees, Buffalo Buffeds, and Cincinnati Reds.

Shulz was primarily a starter, but would come out of the bullpen when needed.  He made 110 starts and 50 relief appearances in his career, pitching in three leagues, the American League with the Yankees, the Federal League with Buffalo, and finish his career in the National League in a short stint with the Reds.  

Shulz died on December 13, 1931 at the age of 42.

External links

1889 births
1931 deaths
Major League Baseball pitchers
Baseball players from Ohio
New York Highlanders players
New York Yankees players
Buffalo Buffeds players
Buffalo Blues players
Cincinnati Reds players
People from Gallipolis, Ohio
Savannah Indians players
Toledo Iron Men players
Milwaukee Brewers (minor league) players